Shaun Easthope (born 23 May 1981) is a Samoan footballer who plays as a midfielder. He played for Samoa at 2014 FIFA World Cup qualifiers.

Easthope studied at Naenae College in Lower Hutt, New Zealand. In 1997 was selected for the Junior All-Whites for the world championships in Egypt.

References

External links

1981 births
Living people
Samoan footballers
Samoa international footballers
Association football midfielders